Sherman William Finger (May 4, 1883 – May 7, 1937) was an American football, basketball, and track coach. He served as the head football coach at Cornell College in Mount Vernon, Iowa from 1907 to 1923, compiling a record of 57–49–9. Finger was also Cornell's head basketball coach from 1910 to 1924, tallying a mark of 83–82. He was a 1907 graduate of the University of Chicago, where he was a member of the freshman football squad in 1905.

References

External links
 

1883 births
1937 deaths
American football fullbacks
Chicago Maroons football players
Cornell Rams football coaches
Cornell Rams men's basketball coaches
College track and field coaches in the United States
Sportspeople from Oshkosh, Wisconsin
Coaches of American football from Wisconsin
Players of American football from Wisconsin
Basketball coaches from Wisconsin